Baudona is a genus of beetles in the family Cerambycidae, containing the following species:

 Baudona borneotica Breuning, 1969
 Baudona ochreovittata Breuning, 1963

References

Apomecynini
Cerambycidae genera